Look Back is a 1967 American documentary film directed by D. A. Pennebaker that covers Bob Dylan's 1965 concert tour in England.

In 1998, the film was selected for preservation in the United States National Film Registry by the Library of Congress as being deemed "culturally, historically, or aesthetically significant". In a 2014 Sight & Sound poll, film critics voted Dont Look Back the joint ninth best documentary film of all time.

Synopsis
The opening scene of the film has Dylan displaying and discarding a series of cue cards bearing selected words and phrases from the lyrics to his 1965 song "Subterranean Homesick Blues" (including intentional misspellings and puns). This was the first single from his most recent album, Bringing It All Back Home, and a top ten hit in the UK when he filmed it there (a fact discussed in the film). Allen Ginsberg appears in the background having a discussion with Bob Neuwirth.

The film features Joan Baez, Donovan and Alan Price (who had just left the Animals), Dylan's manager Albert Grossman and his road manager Neuwirth. Marianne Faithfull, John Mayall, Ginger Baker and Allen Ginsberg may also be glimpsed in the background. Notable scenes include:

Dylan and Baez singing Hank Williams songs in a hotel room, as well as Baez singing the first few verses of "Sally Go Round the Roses", "Percy's Song" and "Love Is Just a Four-Letter Word" (which was still apparently unfinished at the time, as Baez later tells Dylan, "If you finish it I'll sing it on a record"; she would record it on Any Day Now in 1968).
Dylan's pre-concert philosophical jousting with a "science student" (Terry Ellis, who later co-founded Chrysalis Records).
Grossman negotiating with former bebop dance band leader and music agent Tito Burns.
Dylan singing "Only a Pawn in Their Game" on July 6, 1963, at a Voters' Registration Rally in Greenwood, Mississippi (shot by artist and experimental filmmaker Ed Emshwiller).
Dylan's interrupting Alan Price's backstage performance of "Little Things" to ask Price why he left the Animals.
Dylan's extended taunting of Times London arts and science correspondent Horace Freeland Judson who was subjected to what he believes to be a contrived tirade of abuse from Dylan. Dylan claims both that he is not a folk singer, and not a pop singer.
A selection of songs from Dylan's Royal Albert Hall performance.
Dylan regaling the room with "It's All Over Now, Baby Blue" at Donovan's request after proclaiming "Hey, that's a good song, man!" during Donovan's performance of "To Sing for You".

Cast

Credited
Bob Dylan
Albert Grossman
Bob Neuwirth
Joan Baez
Alan Price
Tito Burns
Donovan
Derroll Adams

Uncredited
Howard Alk
Jones Alk
Chris Ellis
Terry Ellis
Marianne Faithfull
Allen Ginsberg
Dorris Henderson
John Mayall
Brian Pendleton
John Renbourn
Tom Wilson

Title

The original title of this film is Dont Look Back, without an apostrophe in the first word. D. A. Pennebaker, the film's writer director, decided to punctuate the title this way because "It was my attempt to simplify the language". Many sources, however, have assumed this to be a typographical error and have "corrected" the title to Don't Look Back. In the commentary track to the DVD release, Pennebaker said that the title came from the Satchel Paige quote, "Don't look back. Something might be gaining on you," and that Dylan shared this view.

Production
The film was shot in black-and-white with a handheld 16mm-film camera and utilized direct sound, thus creating the template for the "rockumentary" film genre. Production began when Dylan arrived in England on April 26, 1965, and ended shortly after his final UK concert at the Royal Albert Hall on May 10. Pennebaker has stated that the famous "Subterranean Homesick Blues" music video that is shown at the beginning of the film was actually shot at the very end of filming. Pennebaker decided during editing to place it at the beginning of the film as a "stage" for Dylan to begin the film.

Release
The film was first shown publicly May 17, 1967, at the Presidio Theater in San Francisco, and opened that September at the 34th Street East Theater in New York.

A transcript of the film, with photographs, was published in 1968 by Ballantine Books.

Reception
The film has been very well received by critics. It currently has a rating of 91% on Rotten Tomatoes based on 55 reviews. The film also received a 5 star review from allmovie. It has a Metacritic score of 84, indicating "universal acclaim". In August 1967, a Newsweek reviewer wrote, "Dont Look Back is really about fame and how it menaces art, about the press and how it categorizes, bowdlerizes, sterilizes, universalizes or conventionalizes an original like Dylan into something it can dimly understand".

Kurt Cobain identified it as the only "good documentary about rock and roll" in a 1992 interview with his Nirvana band mates, a sentiment with which Dave Grohl concurred.

Home media
Dont Look Back has been released and re-released on home video in many formats, from VHS to Blu-ray, over the decades. A digitally remastered deluxe DVD edition was released on February 27, 2007. The two-disc edition contained the remastered film, five additional audio tracks, commentary by filmmaker D. A. Pennebaker and Tour Road Manager Bob Neuwirth, an alternative version on the video for "Subterranean Homesick Blues", the original companion book edited by D. A. Pennebaker to coincide with the film's release in 1968, a flip-book for a section of the "Subterranean Homesick Blues" video, and a brand new documentary by D. A. Pennebaker and edited by Walker Lamond called 65 Revisited. The DVD packaging was also given new artwork.

On November 24, 2015, The Criterion Collection released a newly restored 4K transfer of the film on Blu-ray and DVD. The Criterion version contained new special features.

See also
List of American films of 1967
Festival - Oscar-nominated concert documentary from the same year also featuring Dylan

References

Literature
 Hall, Jeanne (1998): Don´t you ever just watch? American Cinéma vérité and DONT LOOK BACK. In: Grant, Barry Keith/Sloniowski, Jeannette (eds.): Documenting the Documentary. Close Readings of Documentary Film and Video. pp. 223–236, Detroit: Wayne St. University Press, 
 (This book contains a lengthy chapter on Dont Look Back and its cultural context and significance.)

External links

Review of 65 Revisited in The New York Times.
Dont Look Back: Everybody Loves You for Your Black Eye an essay by Robert Polito at the Criterion Collection
Don’t Look Back essay by Daniel Eagan in America's Film Legacy: The Authoritative Guide to the Landmark Movies in the National Film Registry, A&C Black, 2010 , pages 623-624 

1967 films
1967 documentary films
American rock music films
American documentary films
Black-and-white documentary films
Rockumentaries
United States National Film Registry films
Films directed by D. A. Pennebaker
Films about Bob Dylan
Bob Dylan video albums
American black-and-white films
Films shot in Greater Manchester
Films shot in 16 mm film
1960s English-language films
1960s American films